Pusia savignyi is a species of ribbed miters, a genus of marine sea snails.

Distribution
This marine species occurs off Sicily, Italy.

References

External links
 Payraudeau, B. C. (1826). Catalogue descriptif et méthodique des annelides et des mollusques de l'Ile de Corse; avec huit planches représentant quatre-vingt-huit espèces, dont soixante-huit nouvelles. 218 pp. Paris.

savignyi